Anemesia is a genus of Asian wafer trapdoor spiders that was first described by Reginald Innes Pocock in 1895.

Species
 it contains fourteen species:
Anemesia andreevae (Zonstein, 2018) – Uzbekistan, Tajikistan
Anemesia birulai (Spassky, 1937) – Turkmenistan
Anemesia castanea (Zonstein, 2018) – Tajikistan
Anemesia incana (Zonstein, 2001) – Tajikistan
Anemesia infumata (Zonstein, 2018) – Tajikistan
Anemesia infuscata (Zonstein, 2018) – Tajikistan
Anemesia karatauvi (Andreeva, 1968) – Tajikistan
Anemesia koponeni (Marusik, Zamani & Mirshamsi, 2014) – Iran
Anemesia oxiana (Zonstein, 2018) – Tajikistan
Anemesia pallida (Zonstein, 2018) – Tajikistan
Anemesia parvula (Zonstein, 2018) – Tajikistan
Anemesia pococki (Zonstein, 2018) – Turkmenistan
Anemesia sogdiana (Zonstein, 2018) – Uzbekistan, Tajikistan
Anemesia tubifex (Pocock, 1889) (type) – Afghanistan, Turkmenistan

References

Cyrtaucheniidae
Mygalomorphae genera
Taxa named by R. I. Pocock